Robin Chan may refer to:

 Robin Chan (businessman) (born 1932), chairman of the Asia Financial Group
 Robin Chan (soccer) (born 1968), retired Malaysian-American soccer player